Annweiler am Trifels, or Annweiler is a town in the Südliche Weinstraße district, in Rhineland-Palatinate, Germany. It is situated on the river Queich, 12 km west of Landau. Annweiler am Trifels station is on the  Landau–Saarbrücken railway.

Annweiler is situated in the Southern part of the Palatinate forest called the Wasgau, and is surrounded by high hills which yield a famous red sandstone.  The town's main industry is tourism.  On the Sonnenberg (493 m) lie the ruins of the castle of Trifels, in which Richard Coeur de Lion was imprisoned from 31 March to 19 April 1193.

Annweiler is the seat of the Verbandsgemeinde ("collective municipality") of Annweiler am Trifels.

In a 1911 edition of the Brockhaus Enzyklopädie, the area around Annweiler was referred to as "Pfälzer Schweiz".

Annweiler has a primary school and a secondary school ( Staatliche Realschule Annweiler ) which was a partner school with the William Lovell Secondary School in Stickney, Lincolnshire. There is also a school for people with learning disabilities and a vocational school and the Trifels-Gymnasium evangelical grammar school.

Mayors
 Christian Sieben (1815–1832)
 Heinrich Pasquay (1832–1833)
 Abraham Noe (1833–1835)
 Heinrich Mühlhäuser (1837–1848)
 Wilhelm Köstner (1848–1851)
 Matthäus Künkele (1852)
 Georg Jacoby (1853–1858)
 Philipp Streccius (1871–1874)
 Karl Culmann (1875–1877)
 Georg Jacoby (1877–1885)
 August Pasquay (1885–1899)
 Philipp Daniel Bartz (1900–1913)
 Jean Meyer (1913–1918)
 Philipp Mergenthaler (1918–1919)
 Adolf Hoffmann (1920–1921)
 Heinrich Gotthold (1921)
 Konrad Bretz (1921–1928)
 Friedrich Orth (1928–1933)
 Karl Becker (1933)
 Richard Bärsch (1933–1935)
 Friedrich Peters (1935–1940)
 Richard Bärsch (1940–1945)
 Eduard Diehlmann (1945–1946)
 Friedrich Hofäcker (1946–1956)
 Theo Leyendecker (1956–1969)
 Hans Stöcklein (1969–1987)
 Peter Weber (1987–1994)
 Gert Rillmann (1994–2004)
 Thomas Wollenweber (2004–2019)
 Benjamin Seyfried (2019)

Notable residents

 Markward von Annweiler (1140–1202)
 Horst Christill (born 1959), church musician and composer
 Matthias Kern (1750–1793) Journalist
 Eugen Jäger (1842–1926) Publicist
 August Naegle (1869–1932) Church Historian, Politician 
 Hans-Ulrich Pfaffmann Politician 
 Jutta Kleinschmidt  Auto Racing Driver
 Gustav Franz Ullrich Industrialist
 Friedrich Gerhard Wahl Engineer and Architect (1748–1826)

International relations

Annweiler am Trifels is twinned with:
 Ambert, France
 Gorgonzola, Italy

Notes and references

References

Towns in Rhineland-Palatinate
Palatinate Forest
Südliche Weinstraße